Kuh-e Hajji Koshteh is a mountain of the Alburz in Iran. It is situated near Nishapur in the North Khorasan Province.

References

One-thousanders of Iran
Landforms of North Khorasan Province
Mountains of North Khorasan Province.
Mountains of Iran